Ignacio "Nacho" Pais Mayán (born 30 May 2000) is an Argentine professional footballer who plays as a midfielder for Spanish club FC Cartagena B.

Club career
Born in Quilmes, Pais represented Racing Club as a youth before moving to Spain in 2018. After finishing his formation with CD Diocesano, he signed for Tercera División side CF La Solana on 7 August 2019.

On 23 December 2019, after becoming a regular starter, Pais moved to FC Cartagena and was assigned to the reserves also in the fourth tier. On 20 July 2021, he signed for Segunda División RFEF side Antequera CF.

On 10 August 2022, Pais returned to Cartagena and its B-team. He made his debut with the main squad on 10 September, coming on as a late substitute for Pablo de Blasis in a 2–1 Segunda División home win over Albacete Balompié.

References

External links

2000 births
Living people
People from Quilmes
Argentine footballers
Association football midfielders
Segunda División players
Segunda Federación players
Tercera División players
Tercera Federación players
FC Cartagena B players
Antequera CF footballers
FC Cartagena footballers
Argentina youth international footballers
Argentine expatriate footballers
Argentine expatriate sportspeople in Spain
Expatriate footballers in Spain